Thapa may refer to:

Surname, clans and peoples 
Thapa, surname of Nepalese people of Chhetri and Magar castes
List of people with surname Thapa
Thapa Kaji, Thapas of Kshatriya dignity
Bagale Thapa, Hindu Chhetri clan of Aatreya Gotra
Thapa dynasty, 19th century ruling Thapa family

Institutions and heritages 
Thapathali Campus, an engineering college
Thapathali Durbar, Former Thapa palace

Thalamus ahh

Saw all 
 Thapar (disambiguation)
Thapa family (disambiguation)